Werner E. Reichardt (30 January 1924 – 18 September 1992) was a German physicist and biologist who helped to establish the field of biological cybernetics. He co-founded the Max Planck Institute for Biological Cybernetics, and the Journal of Biological Cybernetics.

Life
As a young student, Werner Reichardt was a pupil in the laboratory of Hans Erich Hollmann, a pioneer of ultra-shortwave communication. Because of his knowledge he was drafted in 1941 to the German air force as a radio technician.There he met members of the resistance and established a covert radio connection with the Western Allies. In 1944 Reichardt was arrested by the Gestapo and sentenced to death, but escaped, and hid in Berlin until the end of the war.

From 1946 to 1950 he studied physics at the Technical University of Berlin. From 1950 he was a doctoral student of Ernst Ruska, studying solid state semiconductors at the Fritz-Haber-Institut of the Max-Planck-Gesellschaft, and received his doctorate in 1952. From 1952 to 1954 he was an assistant at the Institute where his teacher Max von Laue was a large influence to his later research. During the war, Reichardt had known Bernhard Hassenstein, who had studied optomotor turning behaviour after the war. Realising these experiments could be formalised in a similar way to electronics experiments, he developed interdisciplinary theories of motion perception. In 1954, Reichardt became a Postdoctoral Fellow at the California Institute of Technology at the invitation of Max Delbrück. From 1955 he was assistant at the Max Planck Institute for Biophysical Chemistry in Göttingen under Karl Friedrich Bonhoeffer. In 1958 he founded together with Bernhard Hassenstein and Hans Wenking the cybernetics research group at the Max-Planck-Institute of Biology in Tübingen. In 1968 the department was transformed into the independent Max Planck Institute for Biological Cybernetics.

Reichardt died at the age of 68 years after collapsing at the end of a symposium organised in his honour.

Work 
Reichardt's findings have contributed to understanding of information processing in nervous systems. From joint work (with Bernhard Hassenstein and Hans Wenking) on the visual system of insects and its effect on the flight orientation, the correlation model developed the idea that the visual system of man could be similarly investigated, and led to a general theory of motion perception

Reichardt detectors 
See Motion perception#First-order motion perceptionIn the 1950s, Reichardt, along with Hassenstein proposed a model of how a neuron receiving input from photoreceptors, which only respond to changes in luminance, could be used to compute motion. Each photoreceptor, responded to a change in luminance at a given location in visual space. Comparison of the phase shift of activity in adjacent cells indicated the direction of movement from one neuron's receptive field to the other. This model of micro-circuitry became known as a Reichardt detector. Whilst there is experimental evidence consistent with the hypothetical behaviour of a Reichardt detector, the corresponding circuitry has not yet been found.

In honor of Reichardt's pioneering work, the Tübingen cluster of excellence Werner Reichardt Centre for Integrative Neuroscience (CIN; founded 2007/2008) was named after him.

Honors and awards
 1965: Honorary Professor of the University of Tübingen
 1970: full member of the Academy of Sciences and Literature Mainz
 1971: full member of the German Academy of Sciences Leopoldina Hall
 1972: foreign member of the American Academy of Arts and Sciences Cambridge (Massachusetts)
 1978: foreign member of the Koninklijke Nederlandse Akademie van Wetenschappen, Amsterdam
 1980:  Pour le Mérite for Sciences and Arts,
 1984: Senator of the Max Planck Society
 1985: HP Heineken Prize for Biochemistry and Biophysics (together with Bela Julesz)
 1988: foreign member of the National Academy of Sciences, Washington, D.C.
 1989: foreign member of the American Philosophical Society Philadelphia
 1989: Member of the Academia Europaea
 1989: honorary doctorate of the RWTH Aachen

References 
 In memoriam Werner Reichardt

External links
 / ~ wreichardt Personal Website of Werner Reichardt for MPI with vita, list of publications and obituary norm

1924 births
1992 deaths
Scientists from Berlin
20th-century German physicists
20th-century German biologists
Cyberneticists
Members of the Royal Netherlands Academy of Arts and Sciences
Foreign associates of the National Academy of Sciences
Winners of the Heineken Prize
Knights Commander of the Order of Merit of the Federal Republic of Germany
Max Planck Institute directors